Lepominae is a subfamily of freshwater ray-finned fish, one of three subfamilies in the family Centrarchidae, the sunfishes.

Genera
The following three genera are classified as being in the subfamily Lepominae:

 Acantharchus Gill, 1864 (Mud sunfish)
 Lepomis Rafinesque, 1816
 Micropterus Lacépède, 1802 (Black basses)

References

 
Centrarchidae
Ray-finned fish subfamilies